Legislative elections were held in Åland on 15 June 1948.

Results

References

Elections in Åland
Aland
1948 in Finland
June 1948 events in Europe